STS-102 was a Space Shuttle mission to the International Space Station (ISS) flown by Space Shuttle  Discovery and launched from Kennedy Space Center, Florida. STS-102 flew in March 2001; its primary objectives were resupplying the ISS and rotating the Expedition 1 and Expedition 2 crews. At eight hours 56 minutes, the first EVA performed on the mission remains the longest spacewalk ever undertaken.

Crew

Spacewalks

  Voss and Helms  – EVA 1
EVA 1 Start: 11 March 2001 – 05:12 UTC
EVA 1 End: 11 March 2001 – 14:08 UTC
Duration: 8 hours, 56 minutes
  Thomas and Richards  – EVA 2
EVA 2 Start:13 March 2001 – 05:23 UTC
EVA 2 End: 13 March 2001 – 11:44 UTC
Duration: 6 hours, 21 minutes

Mission highlights
Space Station Assembly Flight ISS-5A.1 was the first use of the Multi Purpose Logistics Module (Leonardo) to bring supplies to the station. The steel modules were equipped with up to 16 International Standard Payload Racks for installation in the US Lab. Also carried an Integrated Cargo Carrier (ICC). The ICC had the External Stowage Platform-1 mounted on its underside. ESP-1 was placed on the port side of 'Destiny' as a storage location for ORUs. The mission also included two spacewalks to relocate the units carried up by the ICC to the Destiny module exterior.

Wake-up calls 
NASA began a tradition of playing music to astronauts during the Gemini program, which was first used to wake up a flight crew during Apollo 15.
Each track is specially chosen, often by their families, and usually has a special meaning to an individual member of the crew, or is applicable to their daily activities.

See also

 List of human spaceflights
 List of International Space Station spacewalks
 List of Space Shuttle missions
 List of spacewalks and moonwalks 1965–1999
 Outline of space science

References

External links
 NASA mission summary 
 STS-102 Video Highlights 

Space Shuttle missions
Spacecraft launched in 2001